The Bird Conservancy of the Rockies was first founded in 1988 as Colorado Bird Observatory and later changed to Rocky Mountain Bird Observatory. Its goal was to address bird conservation needs in the Western United States. Its headquarters are located in Barr Lake State Park, just east of Brighton, Colorado.  In 2015 the organization changed to its current name in order to more accurately reflect the regions of its work, which radiates from Colorado to the Great Plains, Mexico and beyond.

The observatory's programs are supported by grants from foundations, federal and state agencies, the Denver metro area's Scientific and Cultural Facilities District, Adams County Cultural Council, Great Outdoors Colorado Trust Fund, and contributions from RMBO members.

References

External links
 Bird Conservancy of the Rockies official site

Bird observatories in the United States
Adams County, Colorado

Education in Adams County, Colorado
Environmental organizations based in Colorado
Bird Observatory